William Henderson (August 9, 1939 – February 2, 2007) was an American singer, best known for being an original member and founder of The Spinners, a soul vocal group.

Biography
William Henderson was born on August 9, 1939, in Indianapolis, and grew up in Royal Oak Charter Township, Michigan. He and four friends at Ferndale High School in 1954 formed a group originally called The Domingos and later renamed The Spinners. They had several hits, especially in the 1970s, including "I'll Be Around" (1972) and "Could It Be I'm Falling in Love", "Then Came You" (with Dionne Warwick), "The Rubberband Man" and "It's a Shame".

"It's a Shame" is a song co-written by Stevie Wonder, Syreeta Wright and Lee Garrett, and produced by Wonder as a single for The Spinners on Motown's V.I.P. Records label. Recorded in 1970, it became the Detroit-reared group's biggest single on the Motown Records company since they had signed with the company in 1964 and also their biggest hit in a decade. The lineup of the quintet included original members Pervis Jackson, Henry Fambrough, Billy Henderson and Bobby Smith and lead vocalist G. C. Cameron. The song, which is about a man who complains about a lover's "messin' around" on him, became a huge hit for the group, reaching number 14 on the Billboard Hot 100 and number three on the R&B singles chart, making it their biggest hit to date. The song was the first song Wonder produced for another act by himself.

The Spinners were nominated for six Grammy Awards and they received a star on the Hollywood Walk of Fame, the second star for a musical group consisting of Afro Americans. Henderson remained with the group for half a century, until 2004.

Personal life and death
Henderson died in Daytona Beach, Florida, from complications caused by diabetes on February 2, 2007, at the age of 67. His grave is located at Detroit's Woodlawn Cemetery.

Henderson and his wife Barbara had three sons: Charles, Sterling and Joseph.

See also

It's a Shame (The Spinners song)

References

External links

Associated Press
"Spinners Vocalist Billy Henderson Dies", Billboard, February 3, 2007.

1939 births
2007 deaths
20th-century American male singers
20th-century American singers
African-American male singers
American soul singers
Burials at Woodlawn Cemetery (Detroit)
Deaths from diabetes
Musicians from Indianapolis
People from Daytona Beach, Florida
The Spinners (American group) members